MinDiv was a standard U.S. Navy abbreviation or acronym for "Minesweeper Division."

The Commander of a minesweeper division is known, in official Navy communications, as COMMINDIV (followed by a number), such as COMMINDIV EIGHT.

References

See also

 Minesweeper (ship)

MinDiv